Valia Kakouti, born 1981 in Athens, won the Miss Star Hellas 2004 title and was chosen to represent Greece at the Miss Universe 2004 pageant held in Quito, Ecuador. Her face has appeared in numerous fashion magazines such as Maxim and KLIK. She is also a professional ballet dancer and teacher.

Job appearances
Alpha Digital TV
Estée Lauder, Greece

External links
Image Management
Maxim Girls

1981 births
Greek beauty pageant winners
Greek female models
Living people
Miss Universe 2004 contestants
Models from Athens